Mander is a surname. Notable people with the surname include:

Mander family, a prominent family in the Midland counties of England
Charles Arthur Mander (1884–1951), public servant, philanthropist and manufacturer
Charles Marcus Mander, 3rd Baronet (1921–2006), industrialist, property developer, landowner and farmer; son of the above
Charles Tertius Mander (1852–1929), industrialist, philanthropist and public servant
Francis Mander (1849–1942), New Zealand politician
Geoffrey Mander (1882–1962), industrialist, art collector and politician
Jane Mander (1877–1949), New Zealand novelist and journalist; daughter of Francis Mander
Sir Nicholas Mander, 4th Baronet (born 1950), son of Charles Marcus Mander
John Mander (1932–1978), poet, political commentator and cultural critic
Miles Mander (1888–1946), English character actor, film director and producer, playwright and novelist
Damien Mander (born 1979), Royal Australian Navy diver and sniper turned anti-poaching crusader
Francesco Mander (1915–2004), Italian conductor and composer
Frederick Mander (1883–1964), British headmaster, trade unionist and General Secretary of the National Union of Teachers
Graham Mander (1931–2021), New Zealand yachtsman
Jerry Mander (born 1936), American activist and author
Karel van Mander (1548–1606), Flemish-born Dutch painter, poet and biographer
Karel van Mander the Younger (1579–1623), Dutch painter and son of the above
Karel van Mander III (1609–1670), Dutch painter and son of the above
Lew Mander (1939–2020), New Zealand organic chemist
Noel Mander (1912–2005), British organ builder and founder of the firm Mander Organs
Peter Mander (1928–1998), New Zealand yachtsman and 1956 Olympic gold medalist
Richard Yates Mander (1862–1917), English organist and composer
Roger Mander (died 1704), English academic administrator at the University of Oxford
Tim Mander (born 1961), Australian politician and Australian former rugby league referee
Ülo Mander (born 1954), Estonian ecologist, geographer and educator

See also
Manders, a surname